Tom Gadd (March 8, 1947 – March 1, 2003) was an American football coach. He served as the head football coach at Bucknell University in Lewisburg, Pennsylvania from 1995 to 2001, compiling a record of 48–28.

Head coaching record

References

1947 births
2003 deaths
Bucknell Bison football coaches
Minnesota Golden Gophers football coaches
Long Beach State 49ers football coaches
San Jose State Spartans football coaches
South Carolina Gamecocks football coaches
UC Riverside Highlanders football coaches
Utah Utes football coaches
University of California, Riverside alumni